The Society of Early Americanists (SEA) was founded in 1990 as an interdisciplinary association of scholars who study the literature and culture of America prior to about the year 1830. The non-profit society promotes the exchange of ideas and information among its members through a newsletter, which serves as the primary forum for members' concerns, through an electronic bulletin board and a website, and through conferences and joint research projects.

The SEA is an affiliate of both the American Literature Association and the American Society for Eighteenth-Century Studies.

External links
 Official website

Historical societies of the United States
Cultural studies organizations